is an action role-playing game developed and published by Bandai Namco Entertainment. It was released for PlayStation 4, Windows, and Xbox One on September 27, 2019. Code Vein received mixed reviews from critics, but sold over two million copies in two years.

Gameplay
Code Vein is an open world action role-playing game set in a post-apocalyptic dystopian environment and played from a third-person perspective. Its gameplay was inspired by the Dark Souls series of games with animation inspired by God Eater 3, both Bandai Namco properties with Code Vein sharing the staff of the latter.

Plot

Setting
Set in the near future, the world has fallen to a mysterious calamity known as the Great Collapse. In order to fight the monsters that began emerging around the world humanity created the Revenants: human corpses brought back to life by implanting a Biological Organ Regenerative (BOR) parasite within the heart, acting as vampiric fighters with unique abilities. Revenants can only die if their heart is destroyed, and require human blood as nourishment to keep themselves from entering a frenzy and mutating into the Lost - cannibalistic beings devoid of reason and control. 

Over time the number of Lost increases to the point where they begin to collectively emit a deadly Miasma, that hastens a Revenant’s blood-thirst and chances of frenzy. Participating in an experiment to stabilize the Revenant population and stave off the Lost, a young girl named Cruz Silva volunteers to become the "Queen of the Revenants", though she later frenzies herself and goes on a murderous rampage. More Revenants are created to defeat the Queen in a mission dubbed Operation Queenslayer, led by Cruz's father Gregorio Silva. 

Though they succeeded in killing Cruz, the Lost and the miasma remain, requiring Revenants to wear filtration masks to avoid turning Lost, and the Bloodsprings (plants that produce Blood Beads, which serve as an alternative to human blood) begin to dry up.

Story
The player awakens in the ruins of a city known only as Vein sealed within a red ring of mist, the land inside known as the Gaol of the Mists. Guided by a girl in white named Io to a Bloodspring plant, the player learns that society is falling apart due to the scarcity of Blood Beads caused by a levy and distribution system and the strict protection of the very few humans remaining in the city, both enforced by Silva's provisional government, established shortly after Operation Queenslayer, leaving bloodthirsty Revenants to frenzy and turn into the Lost.

The player and Io meet Louis Amamiya, who sees the player successfully make contact with the vestige of a Lost without becoming frenzied, acquiring that Lost's memories and their Blood Code (a unique property to every Revenant that grants them their personal powers.) The player also demonstrates the ability to clear away the miasma, allowing for safer travel throughout Vein and exploration of the Bloodsprings. Louis introduces the pair to his comrade Yakumo Shinonome as their group is seeking to remedy the Blood Bead scarcity. Louis tests the player's blood and reveals that they are a 'Void-type', as their Blood Code has been damaged in some manner, allowing them to use the Blood Code of whoever shares their blood with them. The group decides to hunt down the dried up Bloodsprings and follow the flow of the veins connecting them all together in an attempt to find the source of the Blood Beads.

They meet Mia Karnstein and her perpetually near-frenzy brother Nicola, who is later seemingly killed by a mysterious hunter who has been killing Revenants permanently by destroying their hearts. The group's search takes them to the Cathedral of the Sacred Blood where the player finds a vestige of their own memories, revealing their role in Operation Queenslayer alongside Silva and the hunter known as Jack Rutherford. Though the player managed to kill the Queen and destroy her heart, Jack was forced to kill them as they had been directly exposed to the Queen's blood and almost frenzying, though he failed to destroy their heart, explaining why the player survived.

The group then encounters a massive Lost known as the Successor to the Ribcage, who was being constantly reconstituted by a large vestige which the player absorbs. The Successor of the Ribcage, revealed to be a woman from Louis' past named Aurora Valentino – explains that the experiment that made Cruz into the Queen rendered her completely immortal and even though her heart was destroyed, she would be able to resurrect herself. Thus, Silva decided to have Cruz's body divided into pieces called 'Relics', each placed in a voluntary Revenant, becoming the Successors who sealed themselves away in Crypts of their design while resisting the Relics gradually corroding their minds and turning them into beasts. Aurora directs the group to Louis' sister Karen who became the Successor of the Heart, using her power to barely maintain Blood Bead production. Aurora asks the player, revealed to be the Successor of the Blood, gained from directly defeating Cruz, to find and soothe the other Successors to prevent the Queen's resurrection. Jack is revealed to be the Successor of the Eye and caretaker of the other Successors alongside his companion Eva Roux: mercy-killing Successors once they have been overwhelmed by their Relic and storing it within Eva to act as a temporary host until a replacement could be found.

The group first travels to the snowy mountains to face the Successor of the Breath, revealed to be the real Nicola with the one that accompanied Mia revealed to be a clone that Jack killed as its existence, made by using the Relic, which was hastening Nicola's frenzy. The group reaches and soothe Nicola as he was fighting the Relic's influence, reuniting with Mia. Jack is assaulted on the way up the mountain by Juzo Mido, an amoral scientist who believes Revenants are the next step of evolution and is seeking out Silva, who became a Successor himself. Jack reveals that the Gaol of the Mists was in fact created by Silva to contain the Revenants for the sake of humanity and needed constant blood to maintain which led to the Blood Bead levy system. Jack decides to join the group to secure the other Relics from Yakumo's old friend Emily Su as the Successor of the Claw and Eva as the newly transformed Successor of the Throat, the latter joining the group after being restored.

When the group confront Mido, he reveals his true plan of undoing the Gaol as he kills his men so the Relics in his possession would instinctively merge into Silva's body, causing him to mutate and frenzy into the Skull King with the Gaol briefly dropping enough to reveal the outside world is filled with horrific monsters from the Great Collapse. Furious of Silva resisting the Relic's influence, Mido explains though the Gaol started off as a prison for Revenants, it has now become a shield from the monsters outside as he expresses his desire for the Revenants to fight the horrors and advance as a species. The group defeats him before he can reach Silva, but the damage is done with the group's only option left is the player resolving to replace Silva as the Successor. The group make their way to Silva's crypt and learn Io is a clone of Cruz, being one of many sisters acting on Cruz's desire to prevent her resurrection by attending to the Successors. The group then battle the Skull King, who loses control of his Relic as it calls the other Relics as they mutate him into the newest iteration of the Queen, the Virgin Reborn before being defeated.

The ending of the game depends on how many of the Successors the player had saved. If none of the Successors are saved, the player is killed by Louis when they begin to frenzy while attempting to absorb the Relics with the player's surviving companions becoming the current Successors. If the player only saves some of the Successors, they manage to absorb Silva's Relic and take his place in maintaining the Gaol with Io staying by their side. If the player saves all of the Successors, Io intervenes and takes the player's place and absorbs all the Relics into herself. With the Successors being restored, Io transforms into a new Bloodspring known as the Weeping Tree which replenishes the Blood Beads and maintains the Gaol as Vein begins anew. Io also produces a special amber-colored Blood Bead containing her memory, allowing the player and the group to venture into the outside world alongside their comrades almost a decade later to save whoever is still living there from the horrors.

Development
Planning started around 2014, with there being about 200 developers involved at one point. The game was announced in April 2017 and was originally set to be released in September 2018, until being delayed until September 26, 2019. The game's opening sequence was created by animation studio Ufotable. In January 2020, the game's first downloadable content pack, Hellfire Knight, was released. The second, Frozen Empress, was released a month later. The last DLC titled Lord of Thunder was released on March 25, 2020.

Reception

Japanese gaming magazine Famitsu gave the game a good score of 32/40. The game received "mixed or average reviews" for Windows and PlayStation 4, and "generally favorable reviews" for Xbox One according to review aggregator Metacritic. Game Informer Daniel Tack gave a 6.5 stated: "Code Vein has some cool things to enjoy along the way and some nice ideas that shake up the core formula, but they are all incidental details. The heart of Code Vein remains overburdened by stale scenery, boring bosses, and tiresome trudging, and all of that is beyond what some nice touches can redeem." While GameSpot stated, "Code Vein adopts the Soulslike formula in its structure, presenting a familiar cycle of progression and basic combat similarities, and there are some interesting ideas here, too, built around the use of various Blood Codes and their distinct Gifts." Hardcore Gamer gave the game a 3.5/5 saying that the game is a serviceable Soulslike game that comes with its own flair. But at the same time, the story, combat, difficulty, visuals and world all suffer from a variety of issues.

IGN stated, "Despite building itself on well-tread ground, Code Vein definitely moves to the beat of its own drummer, but that beat can lose its rhythm when you need it to be steady. Some changes like being able to easily switch around and experiment with classes on the fly are great, while others like its inconsistent AI partner could be more trouble than they were worth at times. But in both the good and the bad, I appreciated its enthusiasm for mixing things up and getting a little weird. If you’re looking for a unique take on a familiar type of challenge, and are open to loving and hating a game for its many mechanical quirks in the same breath, Code Vein is worth sinking your teeth into." VideoGamer.com praised the game for its combat, but criticized its story and setting for its "lack of originality".

Sales
The PlayStation 4 version of Code Vein debuted at number two on the all format video games sales chart in Japan, selling 60,843 copies within its first week on sale. The game sold over a million copies by February 2020, with that figure increasing to over two million by September 2021.

Notes

References

External links
 

2019 video games
Action role-playing video games
Post-apocalyptic video games
Dystopian video games
Bandai Namco games
Dark fantasy video games
Open-world video games
PlayStation 4 games
PlayStation 4 Pro enhanced games
Soulslike video games
Unreal Engine games
Video games about vampires
Video games developed in Japan
Video games featuring protagonists of selectable gender
Video games scored by Go Shiina
Video games set in the future
Windows games
Xbox Cloud Gaming games
Xbox One games
Xbox One X enhanced games
Multiplayer and single-player video games
Video games related to anime and manga